L.I.T.A.N.I.E.S is a 2020 chamber opera by Nicholas Lens set to an English-language libretto by Nick Cave. The work has been published by Mute Song, and BMG publishing. A studio recording has been produced and released by Deutsche Grammophon

Quotes by the writers
Nicholas Lens in Deutsche Grammophon insight: "The sense of peace took me back to a number of profoundly moving visits I had made to Yamanouchi, Kamakura – a verdant hillside neighbourhood in the Kanagawa Prefecture of Japan – site of the most ancient and highly treasured Rinzai Zen temples in the world. The initial idea for L.I.T.A.N.I.E.S was born in the natural silence that rises from the rainy and vivid green, moss forest that surrounds these 13th-century temples".

With L.I.T.A.N.I.E.S it is the second time that the artist Nick Cave writes the libretto for an opera by Nicholas Lens.
Nick Cave: "Nicholas called me during lockdown and asked if I would write twelve litanies. I happily agreed. The first thing I did after I put down the phone was search 'What is a litany?' I learned that a litany was 'a series of religious petitions', and realised I had been writing litanies all my life." Cave further described the libretto as "twelve lyrical pieces that tracked the birth, blooming, fracturing and rebirth of a human being—petitions to a divine maker demanding some sort of cosmic acknowledgement and finding it beautifully rendered in the gorgeous music that Nicholas composed."

Recording by Deutsche Grammophon
A CD and double vinyl recording has been produced and distributed by Deutsche Grammophon. Nicholas Lens and Nick Cave are credited as artistic producers (musical directors) of the recording. Four vocalists are credited as interpreters: Clara-Lane Lens, Denzil Delaere, Claron McFadden and Nicholas Lens Noorenbergh.

Vocals and instrumentation
Four singers perform with an ensemble consisting of one flute and one alto flute, one clarinet and one bass clarinet, one alto and one tenor saxophone, one bassoon, one French horn, one trumpet, two percussions, harp, piano and strings.

Lockdown recording
Due to the severe lockdown period during early spring 2020 with all the known restrictions, and the fact that all professional music studios were closed, most of the album was exceptionally recorded at Lens' home in the Dansaert center of Brussels. The album was finally mixed at Bleu Nuit Studios.

Synopsis
Litany of Divine Absence
Litany of the First Encounter
Litany of Blooming
Litany of the Sleeping Dream
Litany of The Yearning
Litany of Fragmentation
Litany of the Forsaken
Litany of Gathering up
Litany of Transformation
Litany of Godly Love
Litany of The Unnamed
Litany of Divine Presence

References

Chamber operas
Music dramas
English-language operas
Operas by Nicholas Lens
2020 operas
Operas
Nick Cave